Pseudopolygnathus is an extinct genus of conodonts in the family Polygnathidae.

Pseudopolygnathus granulobatus is from the Late Devonian or Early Carboniferous of Italy.

The three subspecies of P. granulosus, P. g. laepensis, P. g. salawinensis and P. g. maepoensis are from the Late Devonian of Thailand.

References

External links 

 
 

Ozarkodinida genera
Late Devonian animals
Late Devonian fish
Devonian conodonts
Mississippian conodonts
Fossil taxa described in 1934